Crash Test 01 is the debut album of Bloom 06. The album was released on October 13, 2006. The album was originally meant to be Eiffel 65's fourth album but Eiffel 65 members Jeffrey Jey and Maurizio Lobina left Bliss Corporation to pursue interests in their own production company.

Track listing

References

2006 debut albums